The 2010 NAIA Division I women's basketball tournament was the tournament held by the NAIA to determine the national champion of women's college basketball among its Division I members in the United States and Canada for the 2009–10 basketball season.

Defending champions and hometown team Union (TN) defeated Azusa Pacific in the championship game, 73–65, to claim the Bulldogs' fifth NAIA national title.

The tournament was played at the Oman Arena in Jackson, Tennessee from March 17–23, 2010.

Qualification

The tournament field remained fixed at thirty-two teams, which were sorted into four quadrants of eight teams each. Within each quadrant, teams were seeded sequentially from one to eight based on record and season performance.

The tournament continued to utilize a simple single-elimination format.

Bracket

See also
2010 NAIA Division I men's basketball tournament
2010 NCAA Division I women's basketball tournament
2010 NCAA Division II women's basketball tournament
2010 NCAA Division III women's basketball tournament
2010 NAIA Division II women's basketball tournament

References

NAIA
NAIA Women's Basketball Championships
2010 in sports in Tennessee